Sir Louis-Hippolyte Ménard dit La Fontaine, 1st Baronet, KCMG (October 4, 1807 – February 26, 1864) was a Canadian politician who served as the first Premier of the United Province of Canada and the first head of a responsible government in Canada. He was born in Boucherville, Lower Canada in 1807. A jurist and statesman, La Fontaine was first elected to the Legislative Assembly of Lower Canada in 1830. He was a supporter of Papineau and member of the Parti canadien (later the Parti patriote). After the severe consequences of the Rebellions of 1837 against the British authorities, he advocated political reforms within the new Union regime of 1841.

Under this Union of the two Canadas he worked with Robert Baldwin in the formation of a party of Upper and Lower Canadian liberal reformers. He and Baldwin formed a government in 1842 but resigned in 1843. In 1848 he was asked by the Governor-General, Lord Elgin, to form the first administration under the new policy of responsible government. The La Fontaine-Baldwin government, formed on March 11, battled for the restoration of the official status of the French language, which was abolished with the Union Act, and the principles of responsible government and the double-majority in the voting of bills.

While Baldwin was reforming Canada West (Upper Canada), La Fontaine passed bills to abolish the tenure seigneuriale (seigneurial system) and grant amnesty to the leaders of the rebellions in Lower Canada who had been exiled. The bill passed, but it was not accepted by the loyalists of Canada East who protested violently and burned down the Parliament in Montreal.

La Fontaine retired to private life in 1851 but was appointed Chief Justice of Canada East in 1853. In 1854 he was created a baronet by Queen Victoria and a knight commander in the pontifical Order of St. Sylvester by Pope Pius IX in 1855.

His last name is often written in one word (Lafontaine or LaFontaine); his own signature was one word.

Political career 
During the 1840s, Willson continued his association with the Reform Party; he was, for example, the campaign manager in the area for both Robert Baldwin and LaFontaine, the "Fathers of Responsible Government" and first elected premiers of the province. It was the Children of Peace who ensured the election of Montreal lawyer Louis La Fontaine as their representative in Upper Canada. Willson argued that this was an opportunity, as he said, "to show our impartial respect to the Canadian people of the Lower province." Here, Willson is expressing a clear Canadian identity that overcame differences in the language and religion. It was a vision of Canadian citizenship that was ultimately successful, as La Fontaine was elected in the 4th Riding of York. Subsequently, they elected Baldwin in their riding. The band of the Children of Peace was a familiar sight at Baldwin's campaign rallies. In 1844, they held a campaign rally for Baldwin concurrently with the illumination of the Temple. Over 3000 people attended, an event that helped end the reign of Orange Order electoral violence.

In Canada East, gerrymandering and Orange Order violence were used to prevent the election of LaFontaine, leader of the Canadien reformers in Terrebonne, outside Montreal. In order to ensure La Fontaine a seat, Baldwin proposed to David Willson, leader of the Children of Peace, that they nominate La Fontaine for the seat in 4th York. Baldwin also insisted that Sydenham include La Fontaine in the reformed Executive Council, or he would resign as Solicitor General. Their alliance allowed La Fontaine to have a seat in the assembly in 1841 and for Baldwin to win the by-election in 1843.

On 3 September 1841, the Children of Peace held a campaign rally for Baldwin and La Fontaine in their Temple, where they rejoiced "to say that we have it in our power to show our impartial respect to the Canadian people of the Lower Province." Despite threats of Orange Order violence, La Fontaine was elected as representative of 4th York.

However, before La Fontaine could take up his seat, Governor Sydenham died. His replacement, Sir Charles Bagot, was not able to form a mixed cabinet of Reformers and Tories, and so he was forced to include the "Canadien party" under La Fontaine. La Fontaine refused to join the Executive Council unless Baldwin was also included. Bagot was finally forced to accede in September, 1842, and when he became severely ill thereafter, Baldwin and La Fontaine became the first real premiers of the Province of Canada. However, in order to take office as ministers, the two had to run for re-election. While La Fontaine was easily re-elected in 4th York, Baldwin lost his seat in Hastings as a result of Orange Order violence. It was now that the pact between the two men was completely solidified, as La Fontaine arranged for Baldwin to run in Rimouski, Canada East. This was the union of the Canadas they sought, where La Fontaine overcame linguistic prejudice to gain a seat in English Canada, and Baldwin obtained his seat in French Canada.

Family

He first married on July 9, 1831 to Adèle Berthelot (1813–1859). Their union produced no children. His real family name is Ménard. He is the son of Antoine Ménard.
The Hon. Sir Louis Hypolite Ménard, Bart., then Chief Justice of Lower Canada then married Montreal, January 30, 1861, the widowed Jane Élisabeth Geneviève Morrison, (1822–1905) daughter of Charles Morrison, on January 30, 1861. Julie had married in Montreal, December 18, 1848, Thomas Kinton, of the Royal Engineers Department. This second marriage produced two sons who died in infancy; Louis-Hippolyte (born July 11, 1862) and Charles François Hypolite Lafontaine, born April 13, 1864 who died the following year. The elder son succeeded to the baronetcy at eighteen months old in February, 1864, but died in 1867. The family residence was Saint Denis Street, Montreal.

Memorials

The Louis Hippolyte Ménard Monument in La Fontaine Park Montreal 

The city authorities of Montreal named Louis-Hippolyte La Fontaine park as a tribute to Chief Justice Lafontaine's memory. The unveiling of the La Fontaine Monument in Parc La Fontaine Montreal was a tremendous event to honour such a great man, who is considered the father of responsible Government in Canada. In a book published by Le Comité Du Monument LaFontaine in 1930 titled Hommage à LaFontaine.  The book is a compilation of letters sent to various people about the unveiling of the monument in Montreal.  In these letters and speeches, people expressed their sentiments about the unveiling of the LaFontaine Monument and it is clear they saw him as a great man.  Mayor. C.Houde explained how . The crowd was extremely large at the unveiling and Mayor. Houde explained how the monument was erected .  The Chief Justice for Sir Wilfrid Laurier was also present the day of the unveiling and he spoke very highly of the monument and LaFontaine as he said "It is a grateful joy to be allowed to laud and magnify LaFontaine's imperishable name. I would fain do it, excluding in a rise of Canada from colonial inferiority to international equality, wherein La Fontaine bore so great a part.

The Louis Hippolyte Ménard Monument in Boucherville 

La Fontaine was born in Boucherville and moved to Montreal to begin his political career. A monument was unveiled in Boucherville after his demise as well as a commemorative plaque, placed upon his birth home. Evidence of this is given by Dr. Eudore Dubeau a doctor of the town who explained, . Once again he is referenced as not only the father of responsible government, but also the defender of the French language. LaFontaine refused to speak English in the Assembly and fought to use his mother tongue. It was not that he was incapable of speaking English, he just believed people should be able to speak their mother tongue and supported the French Canadians right to do so.

The Louis-Hippolyte-La Fontaine Bridge-Tunnel 

More about the Louis-Hippolyte LaFontaine Tunnel can be found here. In brief construction began in 1963 and they named it after LaFontaine in order to preserve his memory for future generations.

Louis-Hippolyte Ménard Hospital 
The Louis-Hippolyte-La Fontaine Hospital opened its doors in 1873 under the name "d'Hospice Saint-Jean-De-Dieu...La congrégation des Soeurs de la Providence".  It was and still is a psychiatric hospital, although it speculated that they also took care of orphans who they wrongly labeled as mentally ill to conduct medical experiments, they are called the Duplessis Orphans. The name was changed  because of letters from patients, although the reason they chose La Fontaine's name over others is not documented.

The Baldwin and La Fontaine Monument on Parliament Hill 

Created by Walter Seymour Allward who is best known for his design of the "mammoth Canadian Battlefields Memorial in Vimy, France (1922-36), that commemorated the important battle of Vimy Ridge." Allward created the statue of La Fontaine and Baldwin which rests on Parliament Hill in Ottawa. The "La Fontaine-Baldwin administration throughout the years 1849 and 1850  remained in a position of exceptional power". Under this regime La Fontaine fought to see the seigneurial system "abolished, but wished to find means to respect the interests of the seigniors by a proper compensation". Baldwin and La Fontaine fought hard to build unity in the government of Canada and build a true responsible government. If you would like to learn more about Baldwin and La Fontaine a Canadian Historical minute has been made concerning their rise into leadership which can be viewed at Baldwin and La Fontaine Historical Minute.

Awaiting Designations 
The house Louis-Hippolyte La Fontaine lived in as a politician in Montreal is still standing today and is located on 1395 Overdale, Montreal, Quebec.  However, the City of Montreal has not yet designated the building into a historical site. It was discovered in July 1987 by Senator Serge Joyal that this home was once the former home of Louis Hippolyte La Fontaine.  During the Rebellion for the Losses Bill in which Parliament was burned this home was also the target of many rioters. Since it was rediscovered in 1987 its facade has been left to be battered by the elements.  Heritage Montreal has been lobbying for the Sir Louis-Hippolyte LaFontaine House for many years and they are hoping that the City comes forward to help. Heritage Montreal and other advocates hope this home can be renovated and built into something such as an interpretive museum exploring the development of responsible government in Canada.

Writings

Works 
 Les deux girouettes, ou l'hypocrisie démasquée, Montréal, 1834 (online)
 Notes sur l'inamovibilité des curés dans le Bas-Canada, Montréal, 1837
 Analyse de l'ordonnance du Conseil spécial sur les bureaux d'hypothèques [...], Montréal, 1842
 De l'esclavage en Canada, Montréal, 1859 (online)
 De la famille des Lauson. Vice-rois et lieutenants généraux des rois de France en Amérique, 1859 (online)

Other 
 The Address to the Electors of Terrebonne, 1840 (online)

See also

Canadian peers and baronets
LaFontaine-Baldwin Symposium
Louis-Joseph Papineau
Lower Canada Rebellion
Timeline of Quebec history

Notes

Bibliography

In English 
 Abbott Nish, M. E. Double majority: Concept, Practice and Negotiations, 1840–1848, Master Thesis, McGill University, Montréal, 1966
 
 
 Heritage Montreal, "Louis-Hippolyte LaFontaine Mansion", Montreal, https://web.archive.org/web/20110203084745/http://www.heritagemontreal.org/en/louis-hippolyte-lafontaine-mansion/.
 
 
 Saul, John Ralston. Louis-Hippolyte LaFontaine and Robert Baldwin (2010) online

In French 
 Aubin, Georges  (2002–05). Louis-Hippolyte La Fontaine. Correspondance générale
 Tome 1: Les ficelles du pouvoir: correspondance entre Louis-Hippolyte La Fontaine et Robert Baldwin, 1840–1854
 Tome 2: Au nom de la loi: lettres de Louis-Hippolyte La Fontaine à divers correspondants, 1829–1847
 Tome 3: Mon cher Amable: lettres de Louis-Hippolyte La Fontaine à divers correspondants, 1848–1864
 Aubin, Georges (1999). Louis-Hippolyte La Fontaine. Journal de voyage en Europe, 1837–1838, Sillery: Septentrion, 153 p. 
 Bertrand, Réal (1993). Louis-Hippolyte LaFontaine, Montréal: Lidec, 60 p. 
 Auclair, Elie-Joseph (1933). Figures canadiennes, Montréal, vol. 2, pp. 9–19 (online)
 DeCelles, Alfred Duclos, LaFontaine et son temps, Montréal: Librairie Beauchemin,192g.(online)
 Laurent-Olivier David (1872). Sir Ls.-H. Lafontaine, Montréal: Typographie Geo. E. Desbarats, 45 p.
Fauteaux, M Aegidius. Hommages à LaFontaine. Montreal" le Comité Du Monument LaFontaine, 1931.
A Propos. "Historique".Hôpital Louis-Hippolye LaFontaine, Montreal:(accessed Feb 2011) 
 

https://web.archive.org/web/20110202081420/http://www.hlhl.qc.ca/hopital/portrait/historique.html.

External links 

1807 births
1864 deaths
Baronets in the Baronetage of the United Kingdom
Canadian baronets
Canadian Knights Commander of the Order of St Michael and St George
Knights of the Order of St. Sylvester
Members of the Legislative Assembly of Lower Canada
Premiers of the Province of Canada
Members of the Executive Council of the Province of Canada
Members of the Legislative Assembly of the Province of Canada from Canada East
Members of the Legislative Assembly of the Province of Canada from Canada West
Persons of National Historic Significance (Canada)
Attorneys-General of the Province of Canada
Collège de Montréal alumni
Burials at Notre Dame des Neiges Cemetery